Joseph Peter Mellana (March 11, 1905 – November 1, 1969) was an American Major League Baseball infielder. He played for the Philadelphia Athletics during the  season.

References

Major League Baseball infielders
Philadelphia Athletics players
Baseball players from Oakland, California
1905 births
1969 deaths
People from Larkspur, California